Piute County is a county in south-central Utah, United States. As of the 2010 United States Census, the population was 1,556, making it the second-least populous county in Utah. The county seat is Junction, and the largest town is Circleville.

History
Paiute County was formed on January 16, 1865, with areas annexed from Beaver County. It was named for the Paiute tribe of Native Americans. Its defined boundaries were altered by adjustments between adjoining counties in 1866, in 1880, in 1892, and in 1931. It has retained its current configuration since 1931.

By the 1860s, mining prospectors were pushing into central and southern Utah Territory, and several mining towns, such as Bullion and Webster, appeared. Mining activity had slowed by the 1900s, but gold mining (from lodes in Tushar Mountains) had produced 240,000 ounces of gold from 1868 through 1959. As the nation entered The Great War, a mine on the east Tushar Mountains producing potash and alumina became a national center of attention, both because of the strategic value of these products, and because of persistent rumors of sabotage attempts and spying. The town of Alunite flourished (1915-1930), then died as the war effort wound down. Today it is abandoned.

Geography
The Sevier River flows northward through the west-central part of Piute County, joined at Kingston by the East Branch of the Sevier. Immediately north of Kingston, it is dammed to form Piute Reservoir. Two mountain ridges lie north–south across the county. The eastern ridge runs through the east-central part of the county, and the western ridge (Tushar Mountains) runs along the county's west border, its crestline defining the county line. Otter Creek flows southward through the east part of the county; it is dammed to form Otter Creek Reservoir in the SE part of the county. Along the way it is fed by Greenwich Creek and Box Creek, draining the east face of the eastern ridge. The eastern part of the county generally slopes to the south while the west-central part of the county slopes to the north. The county's highest point is Delano Peak on the Tushar Range, at 12,174' (3711m) ASL. The highest point on the eastern ridge is a crest near the county's north border, at 9.893' (3015.5m) ASL. It is the fifth-smallest county in Utah by total area.

Adjacent counties

 Sevier County (north)
 Wayne County (east)
 Garfield County (south)
 Beaver County (west)

Protected areas

 Dixie National Forest (part)
 Fishermans Bench Recreation Site
 Fishlake National Forest (part)]
 Otter Creek State Park
 Piute State Park

Lakes

 Barney Lake
 Big Flat Reservoir
 Burnt Flat Reservoir
 Butte Reservoir
 Chicken Spring
 Clause Pond
 Dead Horse Reservoir
 Death Hollow Reservoir
 Dog Lake
 Dry Lake (southeast of Marysvale)
 Dry Lake (east of Piute Reservoir)
 Dry Wash Pond
 Durkee Reservoir
 Fish Lake Reservoir
 Forshea Reservoir
 Forshea Spring
 Forshea Spring Reservoir
 Hell Hole Reservoir
 Hidden Lake
 Little Meadows
 Little Park
 Lower Box Creek Reservoir
 Manning Meadows Reservoir
 Middle Spring Lake
 Mud Lake
 Nicks Pond
 Otter Creek Reservoir
 Parker Lake
 Pine Point Reservoir
 Pole Canyon Reservoir
 Piute Reservoir
 Rock Canyon Reservoir
 Rock Spring
 Rocky Ford Reservoir
 Smiths Reservoir
 Taylor Pond
 Tuft Reservoir
 Upper Box Creek Reservoir
 Voyles Pond
 West Cedar Grove Reservoir
 Willis Reservoir
 Wills Reservoir
 Willow Spring
 Willow Springs
 Windy Ridge Reservoir
 Wood Pond

Demographics 

As of the 2000 United States Census, there were 1,435 people, 509 households, and 389 families in the county. The population density was 1.89/sqmi (0.73/km2). There were 745 housing units at an average density of 0.98/sqmi (0.38/km2). The racial makeup of the county was 95.61% White, 0.14% Black or African American, 1.18% Native American, 0.21% Asian, 0.07% Pacific Islander, 1.88% from other races, and 0.91% from two or more races. 4.46% of the population were Hispanic or Latino of any race.

There were 509 households, out of which 33.00% had children under the age of 18 living with them, 67.6% were married couples living together, 5.7% had a female householder with no husband present, and 23.4% were non-families. 22.4% of all households were made up of individuals, and 11.6% had someone living alone who was 65 years of age or older. The average household size was 2.79 and the average family size was 3.25.

The county population contained 30.7% under the age of 18, 6.6% from 18 to 24, 19.7% from 25 to 44, 26.0% from 45 to 64, and 17.1% who were 65 years of age or older. The median age was 39 years. For every 100 females, there were 104.4 males. For every 100 females age 18 and over, there were 101.6 males.

The median income for a household in the county was $29,625, and the median income for a family was $35,147. Males had a median income of $26,771 versus $18,438 for females. The per capita income for the county was $12,697.  About 11.7% of families and 16.2% of the population were below the poverty line, including 19.1% of those under age 18 and 7.0% of those age 65 or over.

Politics and Government
Piute County is a traditional Republican stronghold. In no national election since 1940 has the county selected the Democratic Party candidate (as of 2020).

Communities

Towns
 Circleville
 Junction (county seat)
 Kingston
 Marysvale

Unincorporated communities
 Angle
 Greenwich
 Thompsonville

Former communities
 Alunite
 Bullion Falls
 Kimberly
 Virginia
 Webster

See also

 List of counties in Utah
 National Register of Historic Places listings in Piute County, Utah

References

External links

 

 
1865 establishments in Utah Territory
Populated places established in 1865